Trechus fortimanus is a species of ground beetle in the subfamily Trechinae. It was described by Reitter in 1903.

References

fortimanus
Beetles described in 1903